Patrick Henry Brady (born October 1, 1936), is a retired United States Army major general. While serving as a helicopter pilot in the Vietnam War, he received the Medal of Honor, the nation's highest military decoration for valor.

Early life
Brady attended O'Dea High School in Seattle, Washington, an all-boys school run by the Congregation of Christian Brothers, where he was active in sports.

Military career
While in college at Seattle University, Brady initially hated the compulsory Reserve Officers' Training Corps (ROTC) program and was kicked out. Brady realized he would probably be drafted after graduation and reentered the ROTC program in order to enter military service as an officer. After graduation, he was commissioned a second lieutenant in the Army Medical Service Corps on March 20, 1959. On April 4, he went on active duty. He served in West Berlin from September 1959 to August 1961 with the 6th Infantry Brigade. In August 1961, he became the Motor Pool Officer of the hospital in the 279th Station Hospital in West Berlin. He became the Detachment Commander in June 1962 until October 1962. In December 1963, he graduated from the United States Army Aviation School at Fort Rucker, Alabama. In January 1964, he deployed to Vietnam.

During his first tour in Vietnam, from January 1964 to January 1965, then-Captain Brady served as a Dust Off pilot with the 57th Medical Detachment (Helicopter Ambulance), where his commanding officer was Major Charles L. Kelly. After Kelly's death on July 1, 1964, Brady took command of Detachment A, 57th Medical Detachment, at Sóc Trăng. The following day, a commander tossed the bullet that killed Kelly on Brady's desk in front of Captain Brady and asked if they were going to stop flying so aggressively. Brady picked up the bullet and replied, "we are going to keep flying exactly the way Kelly taught us to fly, without hesitation, anytime, anywhere."

On his second tour of duty in Vietnam, 1967 to 1968, Brady, now a major, was second in command of the 54th Medical Detachment. It was during this second tour in Vietnam that Brady was awarded the Medal of Honor. Brady flew over 2,000 combat missions and evacuated more than 5000 wounded during his two tours of duty in South Vietnam.

Brady retired from the United States Army as a major general on September 1, 1993, after 34 years of service.

Medal of Honor
Patrick Brady's Medal of Honor citation reads:

Rank and organization: Major, U.S. Army, Medical Service Corps, 54th Medical Detachment, 67th Medical Group, 44th Medical Brigade.

Place and date: Near Chu Lai, Republic of Vietnam, January 6, 1968.

Entered service at: Seattle, Washington

Born: October 1, 1936, Philip, South Dakota

CITATION:

Distinguished Service Cross citation
Citation:

The President of the United States of America, authorized by Act of Congress, July 9, 1918 (amended by act of July 25, 1963), takes pleasure in presenting the Distinguished Service Cross to Major (Medical Service Corps) Patrick Henry Brady (ASN: 0-88015), United States Army, for extraordinary heroism in connection with military operations involving conflict with an armed hostile force in the Republic of Vietnam, while serving with 54th Medical Detachment (Helicopter Ambulance), 74th Medical Battalion, 67th Medical Group, 44th Medical Brigade. Major Brady distinguished himself by exceptionally valorous actions on 2 and 3 October 1967 as pilot of an ambulance helicopter on a rescue mission near Tam Ky. A friendly force requested extraction of several seriously wounded soldiers from a mountainous jungle landing zone, and Major Brady volunteered to attempt the rescue although heavy storms had grounded numerous aircraft in the area. Flying by instruments and radar, he arrived in the area of engagement and began a vertical descent into the tight landing zone by the light of flares. Unable to see more than a few feet outside his aircraft, he skillfully maneuvered to the friendly forces, loaded his ship to capacity and quickly flew to the hospital. The storm increased in intensity and made flying extremely hazardous, but he returned to the pickup site and once more attempted to land. As he approached the area, enemy forces directed devastating machine gun and automatic weapons fire at him. Completely disregarding his personal welfare, he flew low over the area for forty-five minutes before he located the friendly forces. Guiding himself by the flashes of the enemy weapons, he flew into the landing zone through a curtain of fire and loaded eight patients. He quickly flew the patients to the hospital, and once more returned to pick up the remaining casualties and carry them to safety. His fearless actions were responsible for the rapid and successful evacuation of several wounded fellow soldiers. Major Brady's extraordinary heroism and devotion to duty were in keeping with the highest traditions of the military service and reflect great credit upon himself, his unit, and the United States Army.

Military awards
Brady's military decorations and awards include:

 Army Master Aviator

  Army Meritorious Unit Commendation

  Republic of Vietnam Gallantry Cross Unit Citation

  Expert Marksmanship Badge w/ rifle and pistol bars

  Air Assault Badge

Personal honors
 Chairman, Citizens Flag Alliance
 Dustoff Association Hall of Fame, February 17, 2001, Fort Sam Houston, TX
 Gold Medal Award, Fort Sam AFB, San Antonio, TX, Veterans Day November 11, 2015
Inducted into the National Aviation Hall of Fame in 2013.

See also

List of Medal of Honor recipients
List of Medal of Honor recipients for the Vietnam War
"Dead Men Flying"

Notes

References

External links

Webcast Interview at the Pritzker Military Museum & Library on November 7, 2007

1936 births
Living people
United States Army Medal of Honor recipients
United States Army generals
United States Army personnel of the Vietnam War
Recipients of the Distinguished Service Cross (United States)
Recipients of the Distinguished Service Medal (US Army)
Recipients of the Legion of Merit
Recipients of the Distinguished Flying Cross (United States)
Recipients of the Air Medal
Recipients of the Gallantry Cross (Vietnam)
Seattle University alumni
Sons of the American Revolution
Recipients of the Defense Superior Service Medal
People from Haakon County, South Dakota
Vietnam War recipients of the Medal of Honor
American Master Army Aviators